Parliament-Funkadelic: One Nation Under A Groove is a documentary broadcast in the USA on PBS in October 2005 as part of the Independent Lens series. The documentary chronicles the development of the Parliament-Funkadelic musical collective, led by the producer, writer and arranger George Clinton. Parliament-Funkadelic: One Nation Under A Groove was developed by Brazen Hussy Productions, based in New York City and led by director Yvonne Smith.

The documentary combines archival footage, contemporary interviews with P-Funk band members, and stylized animation. It follows the evolution of the band from the early days of doo-wop to its induction into the Rock and Roll Hall of Fame in 1997.

It is narrated by the comedian Eddie Griffin. It is notable for showing footage of P-Funk in 1969 from the WGBH series Say Brother (now called Basic Black).

Interviews

P-Funk members

George Clinton
Bootsy Collins
Bernie Worrell
Billy Bass Nelson
Garry Shider
Ray Davis
Fuzzy Haskins
Grady Thomas
Calvin Simon
Cordell Mosson

Dawn Silva
Jeanette Washington
Ron Scribner
Cholly Bassoline
Tom Vickers
Ron Dunbar
Pedro Bell
Overton Loyd
Ronald "Stozo" Edwards

Others

Nona Hendryx
Rick James
Shock G
Ice Cube
Harvey McGee

Cecil Holmes
Armen Boladian
Rickey Vincent
Reginald Hudlin

External links
 Official website

2005 television films
2005 films
Documentary films about music and musicians
P-Funk